Gonghwadang or Konghwatang literally the Republican Party, may refer to:
 Democratic Republican Party (South Korea)
 New Democratic Republican Party
 Our Republican Party (2017)
 Our Republican Party (2020)

See also 
 Jinbodang (disambiguation)
 Minjudang (disambiguation)
 Conservatism in South Korea